Unstable is the second studio album by the American rock band Adema, and is the final album to feature its full original lineup with lead vocalist Mark Chavez and guitarist Mike Ransom departing from the band after its release and then again after their reunion, although they returned to the band in March 2017 (only for Mark to leave once again in 2019). The album was released on August 19, 2003 by Arista Records. It features the self-titled single "Unstable" and has sold about 400,000 copies worldwide. Many songs relied more on instrumentation and harmony instead of distortion in comparison to their previous album. It debuted at number 43 on the Billboard 200 before quickly falling off the chart.

Track listing

CD

Limited Edition DVD
"Unstable" (Video)
"Giving In" (Video)
"The Way You Like It" (Video)
"Immortal" (Video)
Behind-The-Scenes Footage
Photo Gallery
Weblinks
& More!

Credits
Adema
 Mark Chavez – vocals
 Tim Fluckey – lead guitar, backing vocals, keyboards, programming
 Mike Ransom – rhythm guitar
 Dave DeRoo – bass, backing vocals
 Kris Kohls – drums

Additional Musicians
Synth Strings on "So Fortunate" by Deborah Lurie

Production
 Produced by Howard Benson
 Executive Producer: Antonio "LA" Reid
 Recorded by Mike Plotnikoff at Bay 7 Studios, Valley Village, CA
 Mixed by Alan Moulder at The Townhouse, London, England
 "Unstable" Mix Engineer: Andy Saunders
 "Needles" & "Stressin' Out" Mixed by Mike Plotnikoff at Skip Saylor Recording, Los Angeles, CA
 Instrument Rentals Provided by Megawatt Rentals
 Pro Tools Operator: Eric Miller
 Pre-Production Pro Tools Operator: Patrick Shevelin
 Pro Tools Editing: Vince Jones
 Studio Drum Technician: Gersh for Drum Fetish
 Mastered by Tom Baker at Precision Mastering, LA
 A&R: Joshua Sarubin
 A&R Administrator: Barbara Wesotski
 Producer Coordinator: Dana Childs at Nettwek Producer Management
 Career Direction: Scott Welch & Mark Botting for Mosaic Music Group
 Legal Affairs: Terri DiPaolo
 Business Management: Wayne Kamemoto for Gudvi, Sussman & Oppenheim
 Booking Agent: Ethan Rose for William Morris Agency
 Creative Designer: Joe Mana-Nitzberg
 Art Direction & Design: Jeff Schulz
 Photography: Joseph Cultice
 Styling: Mandy Line

Charts

Singles

References

Adema albums
2003 albums
Albums produced by Howard Benson